Hervarth Frass von Friedenfeldt (26 May 1913 – 20 September 1941) was a Czech fencer and an Olympian. He competed in the individual and team foil and sabre events at the 1936 Summer Olympics.

References

External links
 

1913 births
1941 deaths
Czech male foil fencers
Czechoslovak male foil fencers
Olympic fencers of Czechoslovakia
Fencers at the 1936 Summer Olympics
Czech male sabre fencers
Czechoslovak male sabre fencers